Bijelo Brdo may refer to:

 Bijelo Brdo, Croatia, a village near Erdut, Croatia
 Bijelo Brdo, Derventa, a village in Bosnia and Herzegovina
 Bijelo Brdo culture, an early medieval archaeological culture named after the Croatian village
 NK BSK Bijelo Brdo, a Croatian football club based in the village of Bijelo Brdo